was a Japanese businessman.

Background
In 1990 he posthumously received the highest distinction of the Scout Association of Japan, the Golden Pheasant Award.

References

External links

Scouting in Japan
1899 births
1991 deaths